Little Carpathians Protected Landscape Area is one of the 14 protected landscape areas in Slovakia. The Landscape Area is situated in the Little Carpathians, part of the Carpathian Mountains, in West Slovakia. The southwesternmost area is Devínska Kobyla in Bratislava, and the northeasternmost area is the Čachtice Carpathians at the town of Nové Mesto nad Váhom and the village of Čachtice in the Trenčín Region. Both areas are separated from the main mountain strip. The area protects  of the mountains.

History
The Little Carpathians Protected Landscape Area was established on 5 May 1976. The law that created the Landscape Area was amended on 30 March 2001.

Before the Little Carpathians PLA was declared in 1976, there were 6 protected areas in the territory: Roštún National Nature Reserve (since 1953), Devínska Kobyla National Nature Reserve (1964), Čachtice Castle Hill National Nature Reserve (1964), Sandberg Nature Reserve (1964), Driny Cave Nature Monument (1968), and Čachtická Cave Nature Monument (1972).

Geography
The Little Carpathians are the borderline mountains of the Inner Western Carpathians.

Biology and ecology
Deciduous trees are dominant, with the beech, linden, European ash, and sycamore maple being most widespread. The Little Carpathians PLA is the only place in Slovakia where some plants grow, for example, Ruscus hypoglossum and Rhamnus saxatilis. Insects include 700 species of butterflies and 20 species of ants. Notable species of birds are represented by the rock thrush, northern wheatear, black stork, European honey buzzard, short-toed eagle, Eurasian eagle-owl, long-eared owl, and European nightjar. The Landscape Area is home to the largest population of the saker falcon in Slovakia.

Protected areas
The protected landscape area includes other protected areas like nature reserves and national nature reserves. These include:
 Strmina
 Pod Pajštúnom
 Jurské jazero

Tourism
The Little Carpathians PLA is the only large protected area in Slovakia with extensive vineyards, which are a part of the Little Carpathians Wine Route. The southwestern part contains the Bratislava Forest Park, which is popular with many visitors from Bratislava and includes localities like Koliba.

There are many castles in the area, many of which are in ruins now. The notable examples are Biely Kameň Castle, Červený Kameň Castle and Smolenice Castle.

The Landscape Area includes an extensive network of hiking trails and bicycle trails. Driny is the only cave open to public.

Gallery

See also
Protected areas of Slovakia
List of castles in Slovakia

References
sopsr.sk

External links

Little Carpathians PLA at Slovakia.travel
Little Carpathians at Spectacular Slovakia
Little Carpathians Wine Route

Protected areas of Slovakia
Protected areas established in 1976
Protected areas of the Western Carpathians
Geography of Bratislava
Geography of Trenčín Region